Dramane Konaté (born 12 April 1994) is an Ivorian football player who plays for Italian club Aglianese.

Club career
He made his professional debut in the Lega Pro for Tuttocuoio on 30 August 2014 in a game against Carrarese.

In June 2019, he joined Gubbio.

On 1 October 2020 he signed with Casertana.

On 13 December 2021, he moved to Serie C club Paganese.

On 23 August 2022, Konaté signed with Aglianese in Serie D.

References

External links
 

1994 births
People from Bingerville
Living people
Ivorian footballers
Association football defenders
Ivorian expatriate footballers
Expatriate footballers in Italy
A.C. Tuttocuoio 1957 San Miniato players
U.S. Ancona 1905 players
F.C. Pro Vercelli 1892 players
Alma Juventus Fano 1906 players
A.S. Gubbio 1910 players
Casertana F.C. players
Paganese Calcio 1926 players
Aglianese Calcio 1923 players
Serie B players
Serie C players